The Lisbon Football Association (Associação de Futebol de Lisboa, abrv. AF Lisboa) is the district governing body for the all football competitions in the Portuguese district of Lisbon. It is also the regulator of the clubs registered in the district.

Notable clubs in the Lisbon FA

Primeira Liga
 Benfica
 Sporting CP
 Casa Pia
 Estoril

Liga Portugal 2
 B-SAD
 Mafra
 Vilafranquense
 Estrela Amadora
 Torreense

Liga 3
Alverca
Real
Belenenses

Campeonato de Portugal
 Atlético CP
 Oriental
 1 de Dezembro
 Real S.C.
 Sintrense
 Loures
 Sacavenense

All-time Primeira Liga table
These are the most successful Lisbon FA clubs in the history of Primeira Liga (as of 02/2021):

See also
 Lisbon Championship
 Portuguese District Football Associations
 Portuguese football competitions
 List of football clubs in Portugal

Lisboa
Sports organizations established in 1910